Nace un campeón is a 1952 Argentine film and was directed by Roberto Ratti. It was filmed in Buenos Aires.

Cast

 Ricardo Castro Rios
 Raul del Valle
 Mario Spósito
 Cyril Etuline
 Luis Firpo
 Ángel Prio
 Gloria Ramirez

References

External links
 

1952 films
1950s Spanish-language films
Argentine black-and-white films
Argentine drama films
1952 drama films
1950s Argentine films